= Third (curling) =

Position in curling

Curling positions
Skip
Third
Second
Lead

In curling, a third (alternatively, vice, vice-skip or mate) is the team member who delivers the second-to-last pair of a team's stones in an end. The third is in charge of calling, strategy and directing the sweepers when the skip is delivering their stones, but sweeps for the lead and second. The vices of each team are responsible for determining and recording the score after each end, and in most clubs, will determine by lot which team begins a game with the hammer and what colour stones each team will use. The third position requires a curler adept at executing shots with a high degree of accuracy, especially draws and other finesse shots, as the third needs to set up the house for the skip's stones.
